Gethsemane Chapel (Get'semani Matur) was a small Armenian Apostolic church in the historic Shahar district of Yerevan, Armenia, that was destroyed during the 1920s to make way for the construction of the Yerevan Opera Theater on what is known today as the Tumanyan street.

The Gethsemane chapel was built by the end of the 17th century, replacing a 13th-century domed basilica ruined during the 1679 earthquake. However, the chapel of Gethsemane had a shape of single-nave basilica with no dome. It was surrounded by the old Yerevan cemetery.

It was entirely renovated in 1901 through the donation of the wealthy Yerevanian Melik-Aghamalyan family. The chapel was eventually destroyed during the 1920s.

See also
Saint Paul and Peter Church, Yerevan
Saint Gregory the Illuminator Church, Yerevan
History of Yerevan

References

Armenian Apostolic church buildings in Yerevan
17th-century churches
Demolished buildings and structures in Armenia